The 2015–16 New Democracy leadership election refers to the two-round election to determine the next president of New Democracy, after the resignation of Antonis Samaras on 5 July 2015. The first round was held on 20 December 2015 and the second round was held on 10 January 2016. Kyriakos Mitsotakis was elected as the new president.

Procedure

Whilst the election had originally been expected to be held on 30 August 2015, 57 MPs called for interim leader Vangelis Meimarakis to stay on until spring 2016, postponing the leadership election. However, following ND's election loss in the early September 2015 elections, leadership elections were planned to be held before year's end.

The central electoral committee of the party met on 24 September at the request of interim leader Vangelis Meimarakis, to begin the electoral process. They set out a timetable as follows:

 1 October - end of candidate registration period
 4 October - end of objection period
 5 October - final approved list of candidates

Technical issues

On 21 November, when testing the electronic voting system, the Central Electoral Committee found a number of issues, which meant that the election could not start at the scheduled time of 07:00 on 22 November. Furthermore, another issue arose on the evening of the 22 that caused the Central Electoral Committee to replace 50 electoral delegates. They then took a unanimous decision to postpone the election.

Mitsotakis issued a statement saying: "We owe a big apology to all the New Democracy supporters, and also to all Greek citizens. Unfortunately the election process can no longer take place today. This is no time to be seeking who is responsible. The time for that will come later." Meimarakis threatened to withdraw his candidacy if the election was not postponed, and Georgiadis called the failure a "fiasco" and asked for the resignation of all the members of the Central Electoral Committee.

Both Mitsotakis and Tzitzikostas called for Meimarakis to step down as interim leader and appoint a new interim leader. On 24 November, Meimarakis appointed Ioannis Plakiotakis, the secretary of the parliamentary group, as a Vice President of New Democracy. Later that day, Meimarakis resigned as the interim President, appointing Plakiotakis as the new interim President.

Candidates

Declined
 Dimitris Avramopoulos, Vice President of New Democracy, European Commissioner for Migration, Home Affairs and Citizenship, former Minister for National Defence, former Minister for Foreign Affairs, former Minister of Health and Social Security, former Minister of Tourism, former Mayor of Athens
 Dora Bakoyannis, former Minister for Foreign Affairs, former Mayor of Athens, former Minister of Culture
 Nikos Dendias, former Minister for National Defence, former Minister of Development and Competitiveness, former Minister of Public Order and Citizen Protection, former Minister of Justice
 Kostas Karamanlis, former Prime Minister of Greece, former President of New Democracy, former Minister of Culture, former Leader of the Opposition
 Olga Kefalogianni, former Minister of Tourism
 Vassilis Kikilias, former Minister of Public Order and Citizen Protection
 Makis Voridis, former Minister of Health, former Minister of Infrastructure, Transport and Networks

Results
The results of the election. In the first round only the valid votes were announced.

References

2015 in Greek politics
Political party leadership elections in Greece
New Democracy (Greece)
2016 in Greek politics
-16 New Democracy leadership election